Hassall is a civil parish in Cheshire East, England. It contains two buildings that are recorded in the National Heritage List for England as designated listed buildings.  Of these, one is listed at Grade II*, the middle grade, and the other is at Grade II.  The parish is almost entirely rural, and the Trent and Mersey Canal runs through it.  The listed buildings consist of a former manor house and a bridge over the canal.

Key

Buildings

See also

Listed buildings in Alsager
Listed buildings in Betchton
Listed buildings in Haslington
Listed buildings in Sandbach

References
Citations

Sources

 

 

Listed buildings in the Borough of Cheshire East
Lists of listed buildings in Cheshire